Green is a surname. A variant is Greene. Notable people with the surname include:

Surname

A
Aaron Green (disambiguation), multiple people
A. C. Green (born 1963), American basketball player
Adam Green (disambiguation), multiple people
Adolph Green (1914–2002), American lyricist and playwright
Adrian Green, English curator and archaeologist
Ahman Green (born 1977), American football player
A. J. Green (disambiguation), multiple people
Åke Green (born 1941), Swedish Pentecostal pastor
Al Green (disambiguation), multiple people
Alan Green (disambiguation), multiple people
Albert Green (disambiguation), multiple people
Alex Green (born 1988), American footballer
Alex Green (defensive back) (born 1965), American football player
Alexander Henry Green (1832–1896), English geologist
Alfred Green (disambiguation), multiple people
Alice Green, American political activist
Alice Stopford Green (1847–1929), Irish historian and nationalist
Aliza Green, American chef and writer
Allan Green (disambiguation), multiple people
Allison Green (1911–2005), American politician
Amanda Green (born 1965), American singer
Amos Green (1735–1807), English painter
André Green (disambiguation), multiple people
Andrea Green (disambiguation), multiple people
Ann Green (disambiguation), multiple people
Anna Green (disambiguation), multiple people
Anne Green (disambiguation), multiple people
Anthony Green (disambiguation), multiple people
Archie Green (1917–2009), American folklorist
Arnold Green (disambiguation), multiple people
Arthur Green (disambiguation), multiple people
Ashbel Green (1762–1848), American clergyman
Ashley Green (footballer) (born 1973), Australian rules footballer

B
Barrett Green (born 1977), American football player
Barry Green (born 1945), American musician
Bartholomew Green (disambiguation), multiple people
Belinda Green (born 1952), Australian beauty queen
Ben Green (disambiguation), multiple people
Benjamin Green (disambiguation), multiple people
Bennie Green (1923–1977), American jazz trombonist
Benny Green (disambiguation), multiple people
Beriah Green (1795–1874), American abolitionist
Bernard Green (1953–2013), English priest
Bernard Green (British Army officer) (1887–1971), British army officer
Bert Green (disambiguation), multiple people
Bill Green (disambiguation), multiple people
Blake Green (born 1986), Australian rugby league footballer
Bob Green (disambiguation), multiple people
Bobby Green (disambiguation), multiple people
Boyce Green (born 1960), American football player
Brad Green (disambiguation), multiple people
Braddon Green (born 1958), Australian cricketer
Brandon Green (born 1980), American football player
Brendan Green (born 1986), Canadian cross-country skier
Brent Green (1976–2009), Australian rules footballer
Brian Green (disambiguation), multiple people
Bruce Green, American film editor
Bruce Seth Green, American television director
Brunson Green (born 1967), American film producer
Bryan Green (born 1957), Australian politician
Bryan Green (priest) (1901–1993), English author and priest
Bubba Green (1957–2019), American football player
Bud Green (1897–1981), American songwriter
Bunky Green (born 1935), American musician
Byram Green (1786–1865), American politician

C
Caleb Green (born 1965), American singer
Calum Green (born 1990), English rugby union footballer
Cameron Green (born 1999), Australian international cricketer
Cameron Green (English cricketer) (born 1968), English cricketer
Candida Lycett Green (1942–2014), British writer
Carey Green (born 1956), American women's basketball coach
Carly Robyn Green, American singer-songwriter
Caroline Green (born 2003), American ice skater
Carolyn Green (born 1933), American swimmer
Catherine Green (disambiguation), multiple people
Cecil Green (1919–1951), American race car driver
Cecil Howard Green (1900–2003), English-American geophysicist and businessman
Celia Green (born 1935), British philosopher
Chad Green (disambiguation), multiple people
Chanz Green (born 1991), Wisconsin politician
Charles Green (disambiguation), multiple people
Charlie Green (disambiguation), multiple people
Charlotte Green (disambiguation), multiple people
Chloe Green (disambiguation), multiple people
Chris Green (disambiguation), multiple people
Christopher Green (disambiguation), multiple people
Chuck Green (1919–1997), American tap dancer
Cleveland Green (born 1957), American football player
Cliff Green (1934–2020), Australian screenwriter
Clifford Scott Green (1923–2007), American judge
Clinton Green, Australian record producer
Cole Green (baseball) (born 1989), American baseball player
Colin Green (born 1942), Welsh footballer
Colleen Green (born 1984), American musician
Conrad Green, British television producer
Constance Belton Green, American lawyer
Cornell Green (disambiguation), multiple people
Craig Green (disambiguation), multiple people
C. Scott Green (born c. 1962), American academic administrator 
Curtis Green (born 1957), American football player

D
Dallas Green (disambiguation), multiple people
Damian Green (born 1956), British politician
Dan Green (disambiguation), multiple people
Daniel Green (disambiguation), multiple people
Danielle Green (born 1963), Australian politician
Danny Green (disambiguation), multiple people
Darrell Green (born 1960), American football player
Daryl Green (born 1966), American soccer player
Dave Green (disambiguation), multiple people
David Green (disambiguation), multiple people
Debbie Green (born 1940), American singer
Debora Green (born 1951), American convicted of murder
Dennis Green (1947–2016), American football coach
Dennis Green (canoeist) (1931–2018), Australian canoeist
Dennis Howard Green (1922–2008), English philologist
Derrick Green (born 1971), American musician
Derrick Green (American football) (born 1994), American football player
Desmond Green (born 1989), American mixed martial artist
Devin Green (born 1982), American basketball player
Dick Green (born 1941), American baseball player
Dominic Green (disambiguation), multiple people
Donald Green (disambiguation), multiple people
Dorothy Green (disambiguation), multiple people
Doug Green (disambiguation), multiple people
Draymond Green (born 1990), American basketball player
Dror Green (born 1954), Israeli psychotherapist
Duff Green (1791–1875), American politician and teacher
Duncan Green (disambiguation), multiple people
Dwayne Green (born 1996), Dutch footballer
Dwight H. Green (1897–1958), American politician

E
Eaton Green (born 1967), English convicted criminal
Ed Green (baseball) (1860–1912), American baseball player
Eddie Green (disambiguation), multiple people
Edith Green (1910–1987), American politician
Edmund Tyrrell Green (1864–1937), British theologian
Edward Green (disambiguation), multiple people
Elizabeth Green (disambiguation), multiple people
Ellis Green (1880–1936), English footballer
Emily Green, American journalist
Emma Green (disambiguation), multiple people
Eric Green (disambiguation), multiple people
Erick Green (born 1991), American basketball player in the Israeli Basketball Premier League
Ernest Green (disambiguation), multiple people
Ernie Green (born 1938), American football player
Eva Green (born 1980), French actress
Evan Green (disambiguation), multiple people
Everard Green (1844–1926), British army officer
E. H. H. Green (1958–2006), British historian

F
Farrod Green (born 1997), American football player
F. L. Green (1902–1953), British author
Florence Green (1901–2012), British supercentenarian and veteran
Francis Green (disambiguation), multiple people
Frank Green (disambiguation), multiple people
Fred Green (disambiguation), multiple people
Freddie Green (1911–1987), American musician
Frederick Green (disambiguation), multiple people
Frederick W. Green (disambiguation), multiple people

G
Gabriel Green (ufologist) (1924–2001), American UFOlogist
Gary Green (disambiguation), multiple people
Gene Green (born 1947), American politician
Gene Green (baseball) (1933–1981), American baseball player
Gerri Green (born 1995), American football player
Geoffrey Green (1911–1990), British sports writer
George Green (disambiguation), multiple people
Gerald Green (disambiguation), multiple people
G. F. Green (1911–1977), British author
Gil Green (disambiguation), multiple people
GloZell Green (born 1972), American comedian
Gordon Green (disambiguation), multiple people
Grant Green (disambiguation), multiple people
Gregory Green (disambiguation), multiple people
Guy Green (disambiguation), multiple people

H
Hamilton Green (born 1934), Guyanese politician
Hank Green (born 1980), American YouTuber
Hannah Green (disambiguation), multiple people
Harold Green (disambiguation), multiple people
Harry Green (disambiguation), multiple people
Haydn Green (1887–1957), English footballer
Henry Green (disambiguation), multiple people
Herbert Green (disambiguation), multiple people
Herschel Green (1928–2006), American flying ace
Herschel S. Green (1897–1962), American lawyer and politician
Herb Green (1916–2001), New Zealand obstetrician and activist
Hetty Green (1834–1916), American businesswoman
Hilton A. Green (1929–2013), American film producer
Howard Green (disambiguation), multiple people
Hubert Green (1946–2018), American golfer
Hugh Green (disambiguation), multiple people
Hughie Green (1920–1997), British television host

I
Innis Green (1776–1839), American politician
Irving Green (1916–2006), American record industry executive
Isaiah Green (disambiguation), multiple people

J
Jack Green (disambiguation), multiple people
Jacob Green (born 1957), American football player
Jacob D. Green (1813–??), American writer and slave
Jacqueline Green (born 1989), American ballet dancer
Jacquez Green (born 1976), American football player
Jaine Green, British documentary maker
Jake Green (disambiguation), multiple people
Jalen Green (born 2002), American basketball player
Jamaal Green (born 1980), American football player
James Green (disambiguation), multiple people
Jamie Green (born 1982), British race car driver
Jamison Green (born 1948), American transgender activist
Jane Green (disambiguation), multiple people
Janet Green (disambiguation), multiple people
Janet-Laine Green (born 1951), Canadian actress
Jared Green (born 1989), American football player
Jarvis Green (born 1979), American football player
Jeff Green (disambiguation), multiple people
Jenna Leigh Green (born 1974), American actress
Jenni Keenan Green, Scottish actress
Jennifer Green (born 1987), American musician
Jeremiah Green (1977−2021), American musician
Jeremiah Green (gridiron football) (born 1990), American football player
Jeremy Green (born 1971), American sports columnist
Jeremy Green (cricketer) (born 1984), English cricketer
Jerome Green (1934–1973), American musician
Jerry Green (disambiguation), multiple people
Jesse Green (born 1971), American musician
Jesse Green (reggae musician) (born 1948), Jamaican musician
Jessica Green (academic), American engineer
Jessica Green (actress) (born 1993), Australian actress
Jill Green (disambiguation), multiple people
Jim Green (disambiguation), multiple people
Joey Green, American author and comedian
John Green (disambiguation), multiple people
Johnny Green (disambiguation), multiple people
Jon Green (born 1985), Australian rugby league footballer
Jon Green (cricketer) (born 1980), English cricketer
Jonathan Green (disambiguation), multiple people
Jordan Green (born 1995), English footballer
Jordan-Claire Green (born 1991), American actress
Joseph Green (disambiguation), multiple people
Josh Green (disambiguation), multiple people
Joshua Green (disambiguation), multiple people
Josie Green (born 1993), Welsh footballer
Joyce Green (disambiguation), multiple people
Judith Green (disambiguation), multiple people
Julia Boynton Green (1861–1957), American poet
Julian Green (born 1995), American soccer player
Julien Green (1900–1998), French writer
Julio César Green (born 1967), Dominican boxer
June Green (disambiguation), multiple people
Justin Green (disambiguation), multiple people
Juwan Green (born 1998), American football player

K
Karen Green (disambiguation), multiple people
Kasey Green (born 1979), Australian rules footballer
Kat Green, American actress
Kate Green (born 1960), British politician
Katherine Green (disambiguation), multiple people
Katie Green (born 1987), English model
Katy Green (disambiguation), multiple people
Kay Green (1927–1997), English cricketer
Keith Green (1953–1982), American Christian musician
Keith Green (art dealer) (1951–1996), American art dealer
Kelly Green (musician) (born 1947), Australian singer
Ken Green (disambiguation), multiple people
Kendrick Green (born 1998), American football player
Kenyon Green (born 2001), American football player
Kerri Green (born 1967), American actress
Kim Green (disambiguation), multiple people
Kyle Green, American politician

L
Larry Green (disambiguation), multiple people
Laurence Green (disambiguation), multiple people
Lawrence Green (disambiguation), multiple people
L.C. Green (1921–1985), American blues guitarist, singer and songwriter
Lennart Green (born 1941), Swedish magician
Lenny Green (1933–2019), American baseball player
Leon A. Green (1888–1979), American academic administrator
Leonard Green (disambiguation), multiple people
Leroy M. Green (1882–1941), American politician
Leslie Green (1875–1908), English architect
Leslie Green (philosopher) (born 1956), Scottish-Australian philosopher
Liam Green (born 1985), English footballer
Lil Green (1919–1954), American musician
Liz Green, English broadcaster
Liz Green (musician), British singer-songwriter
Lloyd Green (born 1937), American guitarist
Logan Green (born 1983/1984), American entrepreneur
Louis Green (born 1979), American football player
Lowell Green (born 1936), Canadian radio
Lucas Green (disambiguation), multiple people
Lucie Green (born 1975), British astrophysicist
Lucinda Green (born 1953), British horse rider
Lucy Green (born 1957), English professor
Luke Green (born 2002), Canadian soccer player
Luther Green (1946–2006), American basketball player
Lyda Green (born 1938), American politician
Lyle Green (born 1976), Canadian football player

M
Madge Miller Green (1900–1989), American politician and educator
Malcolm Green (disambiguation), multiple people
Marcus Green (disambiguation), multiple people
Marian Green (born 1944), English author
Marika Green (born 1943), French-Swedish actress
Mark Green (disambiguation), multiple people
Marlon Green (1929–2009), American pilot
Martin Green (disambiguation), multiple people
Martyn Green (1899–1975), English actor and singer
Marv Green, American singer
Mary Green (disambiguation), multiple people
Matt Green (disambiguation), multiple people
Matthew Green (disambiguation), multiple people
Max Green (disambiguation), multiple people
Melville S. Green (1922–1979), American physicist
Meridian Green, American musician
Michael Green (disambiguation), multiple people
Mick Green (1944–2010), British musician
Mike Green (disambiguation), multiple people
Milton Green (1913–2005), American high hurdler
Mitch Green (born 1957), American boxer
Mitzi Green (1920–1969), American actress
Monica Green (born 1959), Swedish politician
Monica Green (historian), American historian
Monroe Green (1904–1996), American advertising executive
Mott Green (1966–2013), American businessman and chocolatier

N
Nate Green (born 1977), American basketball player
Nate Green (author) (born 1985), American author
Nathan Green (disambiguation), multiple people
Nathaniel Green (disambiguation), multiple people
Nicholas Green (disambiguation), multiple people
Nigel Green (1924–1972), British actor
Nile Green (born 1972), American historian

O
Oliver Green (born 1951), British historian
Ossie Green (1906–1991), Australian rules footballer from Victoria
Owen Green (1925–2017), English businessman

P
Pamela Green (1929–2010), English model and actress
Pamela J. Green, American professor
Pat Green (born 1972), American musician
Patrick Green (disambiguation), multiple people
Paul Green (disambiguation), multiple people
Paula Green (disambiguation), multiple people
Pauline Green (born 1948), English politician
Percurt Green (born 1939), Swedish army lieutenant general
Perry Green (disambiguation), multiple people
Peter Green (disambiguation), multiple people
Philip Green (disambiguation), multiple people
Pincus Green (born 1936), American businessman
Professor Green (born 1983), British rapper
Pumpsie Green (1933–2019), American baseball player

R
Ralph Green (disambiguation), multiple people
Rasheem Green (born 1997), American football player
Ray Green (disambiguation), multiple people
Raymond Green (disambiguation), multiple people
Red Green (ice hockey) (1899–1966), Canadian ice hockey player
Reed Green (1911–2002), American sportsperson
Reed Green (politician) (1865–1937), American politician and lawyer
Reginald Green (disambiguation), multiple people
Richard Green (disambiguation), multiple people
Rick Green (disambiguation), multiple people
Rickey Green (born 1954), American basketball player
Riley Green (singer) (born 1988), American singer
Robert Green (disambiguation), multiple people
Robin Green, American television producer and writer
Robson Green (born 1964), British actor and singer
Roderick Green (born 1982), American football player
Rodney Green (disambiguation), multiple people
Roger Green (disambiguation), multiple people
Roland Green (disambiguation), multiple people
Rona Green (disambiguation), multiple people
Ronald Green (disambiguation), multiple people
Rosario Green (1941–2017), Mexican economist
Rose Basile Green (1914–2003), American scholar and poet
Roy Green (born 1957), American football player
Roy Green (radio) (born 1947), Canadian radio personality
Rupert Lycett Green (born 1938), British fashion designer 
Russell Green (disambiguation), multiple people
Ruth Hurmence Green (1915–1981), American author
Ryan Green (disambiguation), multiple people

S
Sammy Green (born 1954), American football player
Samuel Green (disambiguation), multiple people
Sanford M. Green (1807–1901), American jurist and politician
Sarah Green (disambiguation), multiple people
Scott Green (disambiguation), multiple people
Sean Green (disambiguation), multiple people
Seth Green (disambiguation), multiple people
Sharon Green (1942–2022), American author
Shawn Green (disambiguation), multiple people
Shorty Green (1896–1960), Canadian ice hockey player
Sidney Green (disambiguation), multiple people
Simon Green (disambiguation), multiple people
Skyler Green (born 1984), American football player
Solomon Green (1868–1948), Australian bookmaker and racehorse owner
Solomon Hart Green (1885–1969), Canadian politician
Stanley Green (1915–1993), British advertiser
Steph Green, American film and television director
Stephen Green (disambiguation), multiple people
Steve Green (disambiguation), multiple people
Steven Green (disambiguation), multiple people
Stewart Green (born 1944), Canadian sailor
Stuart Green (born 1981), English footballer
S. William Green (1929–2002), American politician

T
Tamaryn Green (born 1994), South African model
Tammie Green (born 1959), American golfer
Taurean Green (born 1986), American-Georgian basketball player
Taylor Green (born 1986), Canadian baseball player
Ted Green (1940–2019), Canadian ice hockey player
Ted Green (academic), British academic
Terry Green (born 1951), British businessman
Theodore F. Green (1867–1966), American politician
Thomas Green (disambiguation), multiple people
Thurman Green (1940–1997), American musician
Tim Green (born 1963), American football player
Timothy Green (disambiguation), multiple people
T. J. Green (born 1995), American football player
Tom Green (disambiguation), multiple people
Tom Patrick Green (1942–2012), American artist
Tommy Green (disambiguation), multiple people
Tony Green (disambiguation), multiple people
Traill Green (1813–1897), American physician and educator
Travis Green (born 1970), Canadian ice hockey player
Trent Green (born 1970), American football player
Tyler Green (disambiguation), multiple people

U
Urbie Green (1926–2018), American musician

V
Valentine Green (1739–1813), British engraver
Van Green (born 1951), American football player
Vernon Green (1937–2000), American musician
Victor Green (born 1969), American football player
Victor Hugo Green (1892–1960), American writer
Vivian Green (disambiguation), multiple people

W
Walon Green (born 1936), American film director
Walter Green (disambiguation), multiple people
Warren Green (1869–1945), American politician
Warren Green (tennis) (born 1962), South African tennis player
Wayne Green (1922–2013), American publisher
Wes Green (born 1982), Australian lacrosse player
Wilfred Green (disambiguation), multiple people
William Green (disambiguation), multiple people
Willie Green (disambiguation), multiple people

Y
Yaniv Green (born 1980), Israeli basketball player
Yatil Green (born 1973), American football player
Yehuda Green (born 1959), Israeli singer and composer
Yossi Green (born 1955), Jewish-American composer

Z
Zach Green (born 1994), American baseball player
Zachariah Green (1817–1897), English philanthropist and healer

First name unknown
 Green (Kent cricketer)

Fictional characters
 Anna Green (Hollyoaks), fictional character from the British soap opera Hollyoaks
 Artie Green from Sunset Boulevard
 Beth Green (The Bill), constable on The Bill
 Doctor Colette Green, in the Half-Life computer game series
 Ed Green, detective on the TV show Law & Order
 Eric Green, from the TV series Jericho
 Gail Green, from Jericho
 Gary Green, a character in Legends of Tomorrow
 Jake Green (Jericho), from Jericho
 Johnston Green, from Jericho
 Kai Green, from Ben 10 (2005 TV series)
 Dr. Leonard Green, from the TV sitcom Friends
 Lieutenant Green, Captain Scarlet and the Mysterons
 Linda Green, in British TV
 Marge Green, from the British soap opera EastEnders
 Marty Green, from River City
 Natalie Green, from The Facts of Life
 Colonel Phillip Green, a villain in Star Trek
 Philip Schuyler Green from Gentleman's Agreement
 Rachel Green, one of the main characters in the TV sitcom Friends
 Red Green (character), The Red Green Show
 Vernita Green, from the movie Kill Bill
 Wes Green, from Ben 10 (2005 TV series)
 The English localized name of A'ke in John Minford's translation of Jin Yong's novel The Deer and the Cauldron
 Reverend/Mr. Green, one of six original Cluedo characters
 The title family from Big City Greens

References

See also
 Green (disambiguation)
 Greene (disambiguation)
 Greenism

English-language surnames